Lucila Venegas Montes (born 23 April 1981) is an international football referee from Mexico.

Venegas became a FIFA listed referee in 2008.

She is an official at the 2019 FIFA Women's World Cup in France.

In October 2020, she won the National Sports Award (Premio Nacional de Deportes) in Mexico.

References

Living people
1981 births
Mexican football referees
FIFA Women's World Cup referees
Women association football referees